Wesley William Egan Jr. (born January 1946 in Madison, Wisconsin) is an American retired career foreign-service officer who served as the U.S. Ambassador to Guinea-Bissau from 1983 until 1986 and U.S. Ambassador to Jordan from 1994 until 1998. He was Chargé d'Affaires ad interim from August 1987 to January 1988 in Portugal.

Biography
Egan graduated from Cooper High School in Abilene, Texas, in 1964 and the University of North Carolina at Chapel Hill in 1968.

References

Living people
1946 births
People from Madison, Wisconsin
Ambassadors of the United States to Guinea-Bissau
Ambassadors of the United States to Jordan
20th-century American diplomats
People from Abilene, Texas
University of North Carolina at Chapel Hill alumni